Bendlin is a surname. Notable people with the surname include:
 Cynthia Bendlin, Paraguayan activist
 Kurt Bendlin (born 1943), German athlete
  (born 1966), German historian and scholar